El Uvito is a town in the Veraguas Province of Panama..

Sources 
World Gazeteer: Panama – World-Gazetteer.com

Populated places in Veraguas Province